This is a list of Spanish football transfers for the 2005–06 Segunda División season. Transfers are only allowed in limited transfer windows in summer and winter.

Albacete Balompie
In:
  Raúl Molina - On Loan From Rayo Vallecano
  Corona - On Loan From Real Zaragoza
  Juanlu - On Loan From Real Betis
  David Sanchez - Signed From FC Barcelona
  Parri - Signed From Valencia CF
  Sanzol - Signed From CA Osasuna
  Pirri - Signed From Real Zaragoza
  Mingo - Signed From Betis
  Mario Bermejo - Signed From  - Racing de Ferrol
   Rubén Martín - Signed From Atletico de Madrid B
   David Bauzá - Signed From Sporting de Gijón
  David Cañas - Signed From Salamanca
  Garrido - Signed From Valencia CF
  Casto - Signed From Albacete Balompie B
  Albert Cano - Signed From Albacete Balompie B
  Pablo - Signed From Albacete Balompie B
  Cesar Diaz - Signed From Albacete Balompie B
  Gato - Signed From Albacete Balompie B
  Basti - Return From AD Ceuta
  Luismi  - Return From  Murcia
  Camaño - Return From RCD Mallorca B
  Javier Martinez - Return From Atletico de Madrid B
  Rubén Reyes  - Return From Pontevedra
  Catalá  - Return From Lleida
  Santamaria - On Loan From FC Barcelona
  Aranda - On Loan To Sevilla FC

Out:
   Mark Gonzalez - Transferred To Real Sociedad
   Pacheco - On Loan To Deportivo Alaves
  Rubén Reyes - Transferred To Pontevedra CF
  Elías - On Loan To FC Cartagena
  Iván Díaz - On Loan To Sabadell
  Rubén  - Return To  Real Madrid
  Rubén Castro - Return To Deportivo
  Momo - Return To Deportivo
  Redondo - Return To  Valencia
  Valbuena  - Return To  Zaragoza
  Gaspar - Transferred To Deportivo Alaves
  Francisco - Transferred To UD Almeria
  Jaime - Transferred To Racing de Ferrol
  Agus - Transferred To Real Madrid
   Cacá - Transferred To Alicante
   Gaspercic - Transferred To KVC Westerlo
  Pindado - Transferred To Las Palmas
  Horacio Peralta - Transferred To  CR Flamengo
  Olivera - Transferred To Defensor Sporting
  Oscar Montiel -  Retired
   Viaud - Retired

UD Almeria
In:
 Velamazán - Signed From RCD Espanyol
 Jonathan Soriano - On Loan From RCD Espanyol
 Uche - Signed From Wisła Kraków 
 Francisco - Signed From Albacete Balompié
  Varela - Signed From SD Eibar
 Bermudo - Signed From CD Tenerife
 David Hernández - Signed From Arenas de Armilla
 Crusat - Signed From UE Lleida
 Soriano - Signed From Real Zaragoza
  Barreto - Signed From Cerro Porteño
 Cisma - On Loan From Atlético de Madrid
 Carlos Sánchez - On Loan From Real Madrid
 Carlos García - On Loan From RCD Espanyol

Out:
 Esteban - Transferred To Córdoba CF
 David Hernández - On Loan To UD Mérida
 Sisco - Transferred To Burgos CF
  Nanni - Transferred To Siena
 Iban Espadas - Transferred To Ciudad de Murcia
 Sorroche - Transferred To Granada CF
 Isaac - Transferred - To Lorca Deportiva CF
 Galán  - Transferred To Algeciras CF
  Sahnoun - Transferred To Brest
  Rebosio  - Transferred To Sporting Cristal
 Lambea - Transferred To Zalla UC
  Adorno - Transferred To CD Baza
  Leonel Rios - Transferred To Arsenal de Sarandí
  Christian Díaz - Transferred To CF Ciudad de Murcia
  Jamelli - Transferred To Clube Atlético Mineiro
 Carlos Cano - Retired

CD Castellon
In:
 Tabares - Signed From Arsenal de Saraní
 Aurelio - On Loan From Xerez CD
 Fukuda - Signed From Irapuato FC
 Fredi - Signed From Cadiz CF
 Ordóñez - Signed From Benidorm
 Epitié - Signed From Alaves
 Segovia - Signed From Alaves B
 Mora - Signed From FC Barcelona B
 Zamora - Signed From Girona
 Mario - Signed From Girona
 Raúl Sanchez - Signed From UD Salamanca
 Dani Ruiz - Signed From Leganes
 Pardo - Signed From Leganes
 Pedro Hernandez - Signed From Ciudad de Murcia
 Zafra - Signed From Conquense
 Xavi Moré - Signed From Real Valladolid
 Miguel Ángel - On Loan From Cadiz CF
 Jonan García - On Loan From Athletic de Bilbao

Out:
 Marcos Estruch - Transferred To Alicante CF
 Dani Ruiz - Transferred To CD Cobeña
 Javi Fernández - On Loan To Algeciras CF
 Fredi - Transferred To UD Las Palmas
 Ordóñez - Transferred To CD Alcoyano
 Xavi Molist - Transferred To FC Cartagena
 Orlando - Transferred To FC Cartagena
 Natalio - Transferred To FC Cartagena
 Espeleta - Transferred To Burgos CF
 Sambruno - Transferred To Leganes CF
 Javi Hernandez - Transferred To Benidorm
 Julen Gonzalo - Transferred To SD Eibar
 Manu Busto - Transferred - To Pontevedra CF
 Rondo - Transferred To Algeciras CF
 Eloy Jiménez - Retired

Ciudad de Murcia
In:
 Paco Esteban - On Loan From Málaga CF
  Assémoassa - Signed From Clermont Foot 
 Ángel - Signed From Deportivo Alavés 
 Jaime - Signed From AD Ceuta 
  Jonay - Signed From Córdoba CF 
 Diego Alegre - Signed From Sporting de Gijón
  Christian Díaz - Signed From Sporting de Gijón
 Iban Espadas - Signed From Real Zaragoza 
 Guerra - Signed From Real Zaragoza B
 Raúl Medina - On Loan From Atlético de Madrid
 Kome - On Loan From RCD Mallorca
  Goitom - On Loan From Udinese
 Mané - On Loan From Atlético de Madrid 
 Sergio Torres - On Loan From Atlético de Madrid 
 David Rodríguez - On Loan From Atlético de Madrid
 Piti - On Loan From Real Zaragoza 

Out:
 David Rodríguez - On Loan To UD Las Palmas 
 Córdoba - Transferred To Colombia
 Dani Bautista - Return To Sevilla FC
 Toni González - Return To RCD Mallorca
 Güiza - Transferred To Getafe FC
 Godino - Transferred To UE Sant Andreu
 Espejo - Transferred To CD Eldense
 Pedro - Transferred To CD Castellón
 Armada - Transferred To Algeciras CF
  Luciano - Transferred To Terrassa FC
 Aguilar - Transferred To Lorca Deportiva CF
 Espejo - Transferred To CD Eldense
  Merino - Transferred To Real Murcia CF
 Miki - Transferred To CD Villanueva de Córdoba
 Leo Diaz - Transferred To Olímpo de Bahía Blanca
 João Paulo - Transferred To BSC Young Boys
 Pablo - Retired
  Almeida - To Portimonense S.C.

SD Eibar
In:
 Susaeta - On Loan From Real Sociedad
 Domínguez - On Loan From Real Sociedad
 Rafa - Signed From Real Valladolid B
 Iván - Signed From Sud America
 Julen Gonzalo - Signed From CD Castellon
 Azkoitia - Signed From Elche CF
 Jaime - Signed From UD Salamanca
 Nené - Signed From Terrassa FC
 Lezaun - Signed From UE Lleida
 Borrell - Signed From UE Lleida
 Garai - Signed From CD Tenerife
 Asensio - Signed From Alicante CF
 Mayrata - Signed From Levante B
 Etxeberria - Signed From Cultural Leonesa
 Markel - On Loan From Real Sociedad
 Zubikarai - On Loan From Real Sociedad
 Moya - On Loan From Athletic de Bilbao
 Cesar - On Loan From Athletic de Bilbao
 Arriaga - On Loan From Athletic de Bilbao
 Solabarrieta - On Loan From Athletic de Bilbao

Out:
 Jon Moya - Transferred To Terrassa CF
 Ion Goñi - On Loan To Barakaldo CF
 Arregui - On Loan To Rayo Vallecano
 Silva - Return To Valencia CF
 Llorente - Return To Real Sociedad
 Oskitz - Return To Real Sociedad
 Cifuentes - Return To Real Sociedad
 Garitano - Return To Real Sociedad
 Miled - Return To Real Sociedad
 Iraizoz - Return To RCD Espanyol
 Hurtado - Return To RCD Espanyol
 Pascual - Return To Real Racing B
 Quique Mateo - Transferred To Hercules CF
  Varela - Transferred To UD Almeria
 Corredoira - Transferred To CD Numancia
 Burgueña - Transferred To Cultural Leonesa
 Cabrejo - Transferred To FC Cartagena
 Karmona - Retired

Polideportivo Ejido
In:
  Soldevilla - Signed From RCD Espanyol
  Tena - Signed From Villarreal CF
  Keko - Signed From CD Tenerife
  Moreno - Signed From Recreativo de Huelva
  Bello Amigo - Signed From Racing de Ferrol
  Curro Vacas - Signed From Racing de Ferrol
  Kiko - Signed From Alaves
  Juanma - Signed From Rayo Vallecano
  Cristian - Signed From Terrassa FC
  Óscar Rodriguez - Signed From Sevilla FC
  López Ramos - Signed From Córdoba CF
  Marcos Navas - On Loan From Sevilla FC

Out:
  Canito - Transferred To Real Jaén
  Salva Sevila - On Loan To Sevilla B
  Carlos Sánchez - Return To Real Madrid
  Carlos García - Return To RCD Espanyol
  Romero - Return To Atlético de Madrid
  Jacobo - Return To  Atlético de Madrid
  Corona - Return To Real Zaragoza
  Enguix - Return To  Sporting de Gijón
  Aira - Transferred To Racing de Ferrol
  Sierra - Transferred - To CD Linares
  Sabino - Transferred - To FC Cartagena
  Pineda - Transferred - To Racing de Ferrol
  Urbano - Transferred - To Hércules CF
  Paco García - Transferred - To Águilas CF

Elche CF 
In:
 Fernando Niño - Signed From RCD Mallorca
 Katxorro - Signed From Xerez CD
 Raúl Martín - Signed From CD Tenerife
  Toledo - Signed From Real Zaragoza B
 Mario - Signed From Rayo Vallecano
 Alberto - Signed From Getafe CF
 Quique Medina - Signed From Getafe CF
 Gomis - Return From Rayo Vallecano

Out:
  Frankowski - Transferred To Wolverhampton Wanderers
 Moisés - Transferred To Hercules CF
  Darmon - Transferred To Aguilas CF
 Tasevski - Transferred To Benidorm
 Unai Vergara - Transferred To UE Lleida
 Turiel - Transferred To Hercules CF
 Azkoitia - Transferred To SD Eibar
  Zárate - Transferred To Deportivo Morón
 Kiko Torres - Retired
 Aizkorreta - Retired
 Otero - Retired

Racing de Ferrol
In:
   Gallon - Signed From Clermont Foot
 Isaac On Loan From Celta de Vigo
  Joselito - On Loan From Recreativo de Huelva
   Pezzarossi - On Loan From Comunicaciones
  Jonathan Martín - Signed From Cultural Leonesa
  Nacho - Signed From Deportivo Alaves
  Juan Carlos - Signed From Terrassa FC
  Pineda - Signed From Polideportivo Ejido
  Aira - Signed From Polideportivo Ejido
   Bouchard - Signed From Clermont Foot
   Beranger - Signed From Cannes
   Baha - Signed From Sporting Braga
  Arnal - Signed From UE Lleida
  Manolo - Signed From Celta de Vigo
  Carlocho - Signed From Atletico Arteixo
  Jaime - Signed From Albacete Balompie
  Héctor - On Loan From RCD Espanyol
  Ibón Pérez - On Loan From Athletic de Bilbao B
  Jorge Rodríguez - On Loan From Celta de Vigo

Out
  Arnal - Transferred To Cordoba CF
  Arrieta - Transferred To Logroñes CF
  Pina - On Loan To Malaga B
  Tena - Return To Villarreal CF
  Escalona - Return To Athletic de Bilbao
  David Franch - Transferred To AD Ceuta
  Jaio - Transferred To Gimnàstic de Tarragona
  Bello Amigo - Transferred To Polideportivo Ejido
  Meca - Transferred To Real Jaen
  Bayarri - Transferred To Talavera CF
  Moreno - Transferred To CF Badalona
  Bermejo - Transferred To Albacete Balompie
  Sueiro - Transferred To CD Ourense
  Curro Vacas - Transferred To Polideportivo Ejido
   Vosalho - Transferred To Dijon FC
  Sito - Transferred To Ipswich Town FC
   Darmon - Transferred To Aguilas CF
  Flavio - Retired
  Alberto - Retired

Sporting de Gijon
Not available

Gimnàstic de Tarragona
In:
  Lupidio - Signed From Hércules CF
 Rubén - Signed From CD Badajoz
 Morales - Signed From RCD Espanyol
 Nano - Signed From UD Marbella
 Ekpoki - Signed From Olimpija Ljubliana
 Merino - Signed From CD Numancia
 Miguel Pérez - Signed From CD Numancia
 Álex Pérez - Signed From Real Madrid
 Iván Romero - Signed From Atletico de Madrid
 Álvaro Iglesias - Signed From CD Tenerife
  Óscar Álvarez - Signed From CD Tenerife
 Jaio - Signed From Racing de Ferrol
 Irurzun - Signed From Sporting de Gijón
 Diego Reyes - Signed From AD Ceuta
 Llera - Signed From Alicante CF
 Ruz - On Loan From Valencia CF

Out:
 Iván Romero - Transferred To Real Jaén
 Valencia - Transferred To Racing de Santander
 Ibón Begoña - transferred To Deportivo Alavés
 Carrión - Transferred To Córdoba CF
 Ñoño - On Loan To Sant Andreu
 Tortolero  - Return To FC Barcelona
 Angulo - Return To Athletic de Bilbao
 David Medina - transferred To Sabadell
 Iván Ania - transferred To Cádiz CF
 Felip - transferred To UD Salamanca
 Lusarreta - transferred To Real Oviedo
 Sergio Francisco transferred - To Real Unión
 Vaqueriza - transferred Retired
 Fernando - transferred To Cultural y Deportiva Leonesa

Hercules CF
Not available

Recreativo de Huelva
In:
  Toño - On Loan From Racing de Santander
  Valencia  - On Loan From Villarreal CF
  Barber - Signed From Conquense
   Juvenal - Signed From Deportivo Alaves
  Bouzón - On Loan From Celta de Vigo
  Dani Bautista - On Loan From Sevilla FC

Out
  Loren - Transferred To UD Marbella
  Manu del Moral - Return To Atletico de Madrid
  Azkorra - Return To Athletic de Bilbao
  Verza - Return To Villarreal CF
  Moreno - Transferred To Polideportivo Ejido
   Mario Silva - Transferred To Cadiz CF

Levante UD 
In:
  Javi Rodríguez - Signed From Pontevedra CF
  Nagore - Signed From RCD Mallorca
   Riga - Signed From Sparta de Rotterdam
   Courtois - Signed From Istres
  Carmelo - Signed From UD Las Palmas
  Lombardi - Signed From Paraná
  Tello - Signed From Real Madrid B

Out
  Rivera - Transferred To Real Betis
  Mora - Transferred To Valencia CF
  Pinillos - Transferred To Racing de Santander
  Jofre - Transferred To RCD Espanyol
  Sergio Garcia - Transferred To Real Zaragoza
   Celestini - Transferred To Getafe CF

CD Numancia
In:
  Ibon Gutiérrez - On Loan From Athletic de Bilbao
  Hamilton - Signed From Deportivo Cali
  Tarantino - On Loan From Athletic de Bilbao
   Montenegro - Signed From Pontevedra CF
  Juan Pablo - Signed From Deportivo Alaves
  Navas - Signed From Terrassa FC
  Rubén López - Signed From Terrassa FC
  Corredoira - Signed From SD Eibar
  Del Pino - Signed From Xerez CD
  Monteagudo - Signed From Xerez CD
  Yanguas - Signed From Getafe CF
  Azkorra - On Loan From Athletic de Bilbao
  Pablo Niño - On Loan From Real Betis

Out
  Monteagudo - Transferred To UD Las Palmas
  Mario - On Loan To UD Las Palmas
  Jordá - Transferred To Benidorm UD
  Juanma - Transferred To UD Merida
  Toché - Return To Atletico de Madrid
  Tarantino - Return To Athletic de Bilbao
  Ros - Return To FC Barcelona
  Merino - Transferred To Gimnàstic de Tarragona
  Miguel Perez - Transferred To Gimnàstic de Tarragona
  Juanlu - Transferred To Real Betis
  De Miguel - Transferred To Sabadell
   Pignol - Transferred To Real Murcia

UE Lleida
In:
 Camacho - Signed From Real Zaragoza
 Juanlu - On Loan From Valencia CF
 Luiz Carlos - Signed From Paysandú
 Bilic - Signed From Cordoba CF
 Unai - Signed From Elche CF
 Ros - Signed From CD Numancia
 Eneko - Signed From Rayo Vallecano
 Carrillo - Signed From L’Hospitalet
 Povedano - Signed From Ponferradina
 Juanma Cruz - Signed From Sabadell
 Jacobo - On Loan From Atletico de Madrid

Out
 Lanzarote - On Loan To Atletico de Madrid B
 Catalá - Return To Albacete Balompie
 Ros - Return To FC Barcelona
 Olalla - Transferred To Rayo Vallecano
 Crusat - Transferred To UD Almeria
 Lezaun - Transferred To SD Eibar

Lorca Deportiva
In:
 Marc Bertrán - On Loan From Cadiz CF
 Isaac - Signed From UD Almeria
 Aguilar - Signed From Ciudad de Murcia
 Gorka García - Signed From Cordoba CF
 Maldonado - Signed From AD Ceuta
 Alves - Signed From Pontevedra
 Quintana - On Loan From Celta de Vigo
  Sava - On Loan From Fulham
 Velázquez - On Loan From Cadiz CF

Out
 Castellanos - Transferred To Real Jaen
 Toni Bernal - transferred To Motril
 Rafa Moreno - transferred To Villanueva de Cordoba
 Caballero - transferred To FC Cartagena
 Gerard - transferred To Terrassa FC
 Lezaun - transferred To SD Eibar
 Gurrutxaga - transferred To Real Jaen
 Pomar - transferred To Amurrio
 Mesa - transferred To Alcoyano

Real Madrid Castilla
In:
 Rubén González Rocha - Return From Albacete Balompié
 Agustín Garcia Iñiguez - Signed From Albacete Balompié
 Álvaro Negredo Sánchez - Signed From Rayo Vallecano de Madrid
 Óscar Díaz Gónzalez - Signed From AD Alcorcón
 Filipe Luís Kasmirski - Signed From Figueirense FC
 Francisco Casilla Cortes - Promoted From Real Madrid C
 Javier Angel Balboa Osa - Promoted From Real Madrid C
 Borja Valero Iglesias - Promoted From Real Madrid C
 Esteban Granero Molina - Promoted From Real Madrid C

Out:
 Juan Olalla Fernández - On Loan To Rayo Vallecano de Madrid
 Diego León Ayarza - On Loan To DCS Arminia Bielefeld
 Juanfran - On Loan To RCD Espanyol
 Alejandro Pérez Aracil - Transferred To Gimnàstic de Tarragona
 Javier Paredes Arango - Transferred To Getafe CF
 Roberto Trashorras Gayoso  - Transferred To RCD Mallorca
 Manuel Diego Tello Jorge - Transferred To Levante UD
 Rubén Arroyo Lloret - Transferred To Universidad de Las Palmas
 Victor Daniel Blanco Munoz - Transferred To Unión Deportiva Salamanca
 Adrián Quintairos Bugallo - Transferred To Celta de Vigo B

Real Murcia
In:
  Chalkias - Signed From Portsmouth FC
 Salgueiro - On Loan From Danubio
 Palacios - Signed From Rayo Vallecano

Out
 Michel - Transferred To Rayo Vallecano
  Fernández - Transferred To Cordoba CF
  Olave - On Loan To River Plate

CD Tenerife
Not Available

Real Valladolid
In:
  Pablo Amo - Signed From Deportivo de La Coruña
  Pablo Casar - Signed From Racing de Santander

Out
  Aduriz - Transferred To Athletic de Bilbao

Xerez CD
In:
 Pazos - Signed From AD Ceuta

Out
 Aurelio - Transferred To CD Castellon

2005–06
Trans
Spain
Spain